The men's 145.5 kilometers individual road race competition at the 2018 Asian Games was held on 23 August 2018 in Subang.

Schedule
All times are Western Indonesia Time (UTC+07:00)

Results 
Legend
DNS — Did not start

References
 Results

External links
 Official website

Men's road race